The discography of Canadian rapper and record producer Nav consists of four studio albums, one reissued album, three mixtapes, and 27 singles (including 13 as a featured artist). 

On February 24, 2017, Nav released his self-titled debut commercial mixtape. The mixtape reached number four on the Canadian Albums Chart and number 24 on the US Billboard 200. It produced the Canadian top-40 single, "Some Way", which features the Weeknd and reached number 31 on the Canadian Hot 100. On July 21, 2017, Nav released a collaborative mixtape with Metro Boomin, Perfect Timing. The mixtape reached number seven on the Canadian Albums Chart and number 13 on the US Billboard 200. 

On May 18, 2018, Nav released his debut studio album, Reckless. The album debuted and peaked at number five on the Canadian Albums Chart and number eight on the US Billboard 200. It produced the Canadian top-40 single, "Wanted You" from 2017, which features Lil Uzi Vert and reached number 33.

On March 22, 2019, Nav released his second studio album, Bad Habits, which debuted and peaked atop the Canadian Albums Chart and the US Billboard 200, giving him his first chart-topping project. It produced the Canadian top-40 single, "Price on My Head", which features the Weeknd and reached number 18, giving Nav his highest-charting song as a lead artist in Canada. 

On May 8, 2020, Nav released his third studio album, Good Intentions, which debuted and peaked atop the Canadian Albums Chart and the US Billboard 200, giving him his second chart-topping project. It produced the US top-20 single, "Turks", a collaboration with Gunna, which features Travis Scott and debuted and peaked at number 17 on the US Billboard Hot 100, giving Nav his highest-charting song in the US. On May 11, 2020, Nav released a reissued album, Brown Boy 2, which consists of another album's worth of songs that serves as the deluxe edition to Good Intentions. On November 6, 2020, Nav released his second commercial mixtape, Emergency Tsunami. The mixtape debuted and peaked at number five on the Canadian Albums Chart and number six on the US Billboard 200.

In September 2022, Nav released his fourth studio album, Demons Protected by Angels. It produced the Canadian top-40 single, "Never Sleep", a collaboration with Lil Baby, which features Travis Scott and reached number 18.
 
Nav has also been featured on several songs that have received mainstream success. In 2018, he appeared alongside Gunna on Travis Scott's single, "Yosemite", which debuted and peaked at number 18 on the Canadian Hot 100 and number 25 on the US Billboard Hot 100. In 2020, he was featured on Internet Money, Gunna, and Don Toliver's single, "Lemonade", which peaked at number three on the Canadian Hot 100 and number six on the US Billboard Hot 100, giving him his highest-charting song overall.

Studio albums

Deluxe albums

Mixtapes

Extended plays

Singles

As lead artist

As featured artist

Other charted and certified songs

Guest appearances

Production discography

2015
Drake
 "Back to Back"

2016
Travis Scott – Birds in the Trap Sing McKnight
5. "Beibs in the Trap" (featuring Nav)

Belly – Inzombia
5. "Re Up" (featuring Nav)

2017
Nav – Nav
1. "Myself"
2. "Nav" 
3. "My Mind"
4. "Good for It"
5. "Lonely" 
6. "Up" 
7. "Interlude"
8. "Sleep"
9. "Mariah" 
10. "Some Way" (featuring the Weeknd)
11. "TTD"

Kodak Black – Painting Pictures
8. "Save You" 

Nav and Metro Boomin – Perfect Timing
4. "ASAP Ferg" (featuring Lil Uzi Vert) 
5. "Held Me Down" 
6. "Minute" (featuring Playboi Carti and Offset) 
12. "Rich" 
14. "I Am" 
15. "NavUziMetro#Pt2" (featuring Lil Uzi Vert) 

A Boogie wit da Hoodie – The Bigger Artist
8. "Get to You" 

Gucci Mane – Mr. Davis
6. "Curve" (featuring the Weeknd)

2018
Gunna – Drip Season 3	
8. "Car Sick" (featuring Nav and Metro Boomin) 

Nav – Reckless
1. "Reckless" 
2. "Never Change" 
4. "Faith" (featuring Quavo) 
6. "Glow Up" 
7. "Just Happened" 
9. "With Me" 

Belly – Immigrant
8. "What You Want" (featuring the Weeknd) 

The Carters – Everything Is Love
6. "Friends"

2019
Nav – Bad Habits
3. "Taking Chances" 
5. "Tension" 
7. "Ralo" 
8. "Tussin" (featuring Young Thug) 
9. "Snap" 
11. "Why You Crying Mama" 
12. "Time Piece" (featuring Lil Durk) 
13. "Dior Runners" 
14. "Vicodin" 
15. "Stuck with Me" 

22. "Never Know" 
24. "Athlete"

2020
Lil Uzi Vert - Lil Uzi Vert vs. the World 2 
14. "Leaders" (featuring Nav) 

Nav - Good Intentions
1. "Good Intentions (Intro)" 
2. "No Debate" (featuring Young Thug) 
6. "Status" (featuring Lil Uzi Vert) 
7. "Codeine" (featuring Gunna) 

Nav - Brown Boy 2 
7. "Heat"

2021
Belly – See You Next Wednesday
9. "Requiem" (featuring Nav)

2022
Nav – Demons Protected by Angels
1. "Count on Me (Intro)" 
2. "Baby" 
5. "Last of the Mohicans" 
10. "My Dawg" (with Lil Durk) 
9. "Don't Compare" 
12. "Interstellar" (with Lil Uzi Vert) 
13. "Loaded" 
14. "Lost Me" (with RealestK) 
15. "Reset" (with Bryson Tiller) 
17. "Wrong Decisions"
19. "Ball in Peace (Outro)"

Notes

References 

Discographies of Canadian artists
Hip hop discographies